Gwiździny may refer to:
Gwiździny, Elbląg County, Poland
Gwiździny, Nowe Miasto County, Poland